Glenn Ahearn (born 13 December 1962) is an Australian former professional soccer player who previously played as a goalkeeper for Hakoah Sydney City East in the National Soccer League.

Club career

Hakoah Sydney City East
Ahearn made his senior debut with the Hakoah Sydney City East on 8 August 1982 against St George in a 1–0 win.

International career
Ahearn began his international career by playing with the Australia national under-20 soccer team in the 1981 FIFA World Youth Championship. He also played two full international games against Indonesia and Taiwan both played in 1981.

Career statistics

Club

International

References

1952 births
Living people
Australian soccer players
Association football midfielders
A
A
National Soccer League (Australia) players
Australia international soccer players